This is a list of electoral results for the electoral district of Warren-Blackwood in Western Australian state elections.

Members for Warren-Blackwood

Election results

Elections in the 2020s

Elections in the 2010s

Elections in the 2000s

Elections in the 1990s

Elections in the 1980s 

 In the redistribution, Warren became a notional Liberal seat.

Elections in the 1970s

Elections in the 1960s

Elections in the 1950s 

 Two party preferred vote was estimated.

|- style="background-color:#E9E9E9"
! colspan="6" style="text-align:left;" |After distribution of preferences

 Preferences were not distributed to completion.

References

Western Australian state electoral results by district